Newspapers made endorsements of candidates in the 1904 United States presidential election.  Incumbent President Theodore Roosevelt who took office after William McKinley was assassinated in 1901 was the Republican candidate, and Alton B. Parker the Democratic candidate.  Harper's Weekly ran a cartoon in September 1904 called "Tom's Dream", a reference to DNC Chairman Thomas Taggart, and his hope that the major newspapers of the country would endorse Parker.  His dream largely did not come true, as most newspapers endorsed Roosevelt in this election.

References 

1904 United States presidential election
United States presidential election endorsements
1904 in mass media
Newspaper endorsements
1900s politics-related lists